The CSU-associated Hanns Seidel Foundation is a German party-associated and taxpayer-money funded political research foundation. It was founded in November 1966 after most of the other party-associated foundations in Germany were already established. It is headquartered in Munich. The conference centre in the Banz Abbey is the foundation's main location. It is a member of the Centre for European Studies, the official foundation and think tank of the European People's Party. It is named after the CSU politician Hanns Seidel.

Background
The Hanns-Seidel-Foundation is one of seven non-profit political organizations in the Federal Republic of Germany. Its large range of political education -founded on the Christian idea of man and humanistic values- promotes citizens’ engagement in democracy, rule of law, and the concept of a social market economy. With numerous development projects and fosterage of international exchange of opinion, the foundation supports international understanding. The foundation entertains education centers in Wildbad Kreuth and Kloster Banz, a conference center in Munich and offices in approximately 35 countries around the world. In the “service of democracy, peace, and development”, the work of the Hanns-Seidel-Foundation concentrates on the consolidation of free democratic basic order, on the assurance of peace, and on the support for international understanding.

Organization 
The Hanns Seidel Foundation comprises four major departments:

Academy for Politics and Current Affairs
The Academy for Politics and Current Affairs is organizing conferences, international symposia and workshops which bring together distinguished German and international experts to examine the problems and consequences of political developments.

Institute for Adult Civic Education
The Training Institute offers seminars for political training based on the values of Christianity. With each democracy being required to rely on the active participation of democratically minded citizens, we seek to encourage participants to show such a significant commitment and give them the necessary skills. All in all, some 52,000 participants attended the 1,351 seminars (2008).

Scholarship Organization
The aim of the programs for German scholars is to support junior academics with the right personal and academic qualifications who are willing to cooperate constructively and with dedication in forming our liberal state under the rule of law. There are a large number of applicants from which the Scholarship Organization tries to select those students which outstanding achievements, social political dedication and personal qualities.

Institute for International Contact and Co-operation
Beginning with the first development aid project in Togo in 1977, the Institute for International Contact and Co-operation has steadily expanded its geographical and conceptual framework. Project work in Africa still constitutes one of the main focal points today. In the Hanns Seidel Foundation’s concept of development policy, strengthening underlying social factors is regarded as just as important as promoting social political structures. This means improving, strengthening and utilizing human capacities, taking into account the social, political, cultural and economic conditions of the country in question. Promoting a sense of democratic community while preserving traditions which deserve to be preserved are among the principles of the Hanns Seidel Foundation’s development co-operation. All projects are designed in such a way that the countries or partner organizations can take them over themselves in the course of time.

See also
Other parties in Germany also use the legal form of a foundation for support and public relation purposes. The other foundations are:
 Konrad Adenauer Foundation (CDU)
 Friedrich Ebert Foundation (SPD)
 Friedrich Naumann Foundation für die Freiheit (FDP)
 Heinrich Böll Foundation (Grüne)
 Rosa Luxemburg Foundation (Die Linke)
 Desiderius-Erasmus-Stiftung (AfD)

References

External links
 Link Hanns-Seidel-Foundation
 Begabtenfoerderungswerke Hanns-Seidel-Foundation
 Alumni Hanns-Seidel-Foundation

Conservatism in Germany
Political and economic research foundations
Political and economic think tanks based in Germany
Political organisations based in Germany